The Bottom (formerly Botte) is the capital and largest town of the island of Saba, the Caribbean Netherlands, and is the first stop on the way from Saba's Port in Fort Bay towards the rest of the island. In 2001, it had 462 inhabitants of the total 1,349 islanders.

History
The Bottom was founded in 1632 by colonists from Zeeland. The original name of the town was De Botte, old Dutch for "The Bowl", referring to its geographical position in a valley surrounded by the various mountains. The island attracted Irish and Scottish settlers, and the main language became English. "The Bottom" is an English corruption of this name.

Infrastructure
The Bottom is home to the government offices, a hospital, a nursing home, a sports field, three churches, a library, various shops and the 200 students of the Saba University School of Medicine.

Events

As capital of the island, The Bottom hosts a number of events throughout the year. During the summer, Saba's Carnival, a parade and mass festival, is held just before the Catholic period of Lent. An explosion of colour, music and energy, Carnival parades are accompanied by the music of steel drums and the works of local artists. It is a highly anticipated event on the Saban calendar, when most of the island comes together to dance, sing and enjoy the season. The Saba Carnival usually lasts for a few days, in which the majority of the island's population congregates at The Bottom.

Another event held in The Bottom is Saba Day. This is the celebratory national day of the island, when all offices, schools and businesses are closed. The islanders honour their diversity and culture through various activities, performances and parades. The Bottom hosts a concert at the sports field, where local (and neighbouring) Caribbean artists come to perform. There are fishing competitions at sea, drawing competitions for children, dance performances, cookouts, and more.

Climate

Gallery

See also
Mount Scenery

References

External links

 
Populated places in Saba
Capitals in the Caribbean